Zeigler may refer to:

Places 
 Zeigler, Illinois, United States
 Zeigler, Indiana, United States
 Zeigler House (disambiguation), several places
 Mount Zeigler, in Marie Byrd Land in West Antarctica

People with the surname 
 Barbara Zeigler, American artist
 Bernard P. Zeigler (born 1940), Canadian engineer and emeritus professor at the University of Arizona
 Cyd Zeigler (born 1973), American commentator and author in the field of sexuality and sports
 Dominique Zeigler (born 1984), former American football player
 Dusty Zeigler (born 1973), American football player
 Earle F. Zeigler (1919–2018), American and Canadian citizen, one of the founders of modern American Sport Studies
 Ernie Zeigler (born 1966), American college men's basketball coach
 Heidi Zeigler (born 1979), American actress
 Jim Zeigler,  American lawyer and politician
Lee Woodward Zeigler (1868–1952), American illustrator and muralist.
 Wilbur G. Zeigler (1857–1935), American lawyer, writer, and Marlovian theory founder

See also
 Ziegler